Fight Like a Girl may refer to:

 Fight Like a Girl (Bomshel album), 2009
 "Fight Like a Girl" (Bomshel song), 2009
 Fight Like a Girl (Emilie Autumn album), 2012
 "Fight Like a Girl" (Emilie Autumn song), 2012
 "Fight Like a Girl" (Kalie Shorr song), 2016
 "Fight Like a Girl", a song by Zolita, 2017
 Fight Like a Girl, a book by Clementine Ford, 2016

See also
 Like a Girl (commercial)